Two Lies is a 1990 short film directed, produced and written by Pamela Tom and starring Dian Kobayashi, Sala Iwamatsu, and Marie Nakano. The film was shot in black and white and discusses issues like identity, Orientalism, and Blepharoplasty.

Plot

The plot of the film focuses on the life of a Chinese American family who struggles with identity. The mother, Doris Chu, has undergone blepharoplasty, or "double eyelid" surgery, and the oldest of two daughters, Mei, has trouble understanding her mother's actions. From her perspective, her mother's two new eyes are equivalent to two lies. On a trip to Cabot's Pueblo Museum off a dusty highway in Southern California, a series of confrontations occur and Mei finally realizes her mother's reasoning. Between the conflicts of Chinese tradition and American ways, the family tries to adapt to their new life in Southern California.

Cast
 Dian Kobayashi - Doris Chu (mother)
 Sala Iwamatsu - Mei Chu (oldest daughter)
 Marie Nakano - Esther Chu (youngest daughter)

Extended Cast
 Joe Marinalli - Nick
 William Merzenich - Pueblo Tour Guide
 Bob McCarthy - Martin
 Melba Yale - Accordion Teacher
 Walter Looell, Jr - Teenage Boy at Pool
 Carolyn Stanek - Little Girl in Pool

Awards, Festivals, & Screenings
 New Directors/New Films Festival
 Hawaii International Film Festival
 USA Film Festival
 NY Asian American Int'l Film Festival
 Sundance Film Festival
 The Smithsonian Institution

External links

References

1990s English-language films